Elza Kephart, is a Canadian filmmaker, from Montreal, Quebec. She owns her own production company, Midnight Kingdom Films.

Career
Kephart's first feature film was Graveyard Alive: A Zombie Nurse in Love, which she wrote, directed, and produced. The film was well received by critics, who appreciated its camp horror and modern feminist motifs, while at the same time evoking the traditional days of black and white, Techniscope wide-screen. Since its premiere in 2003 the film has screened in over 20 international film festivals and garnered numerous awards, as well as being picked up for distribution and international sales.

In 2005, Kephart provided computer support for The Greatest Game Ever Played. In 2006 she was assistant to Tony Goldwyn while he directed The Last Kiss. She also appeared in a 2009 documentary Pretty Bloody: The Women of Horror.

In 2013, Kephart released Go Into the Wilderness, shot in Quebec's remote North Shore.

In 2020, Kephart completed work on her horror-comedy film Slaxx, released as a Shudder Original title in March 2021.

Awards
Kephart was nominated at the 2005 Cinevagas B-Movie film festival for:

 Best B Movie
 Best Director
 Best Screenplay

Filmography

References

External links

Go in the Wilderness
Midnight Kingdom Films
Festival du nouveau cinéma

1976 births
Canadian women film directors
Canadian women screenwriters
Film directors from Montreal
Living people
Writers from Montreal